Xenozoic Tales is an alternative comic book by Mark Schultz set in a post-apocalyptic future. Originally published by Kitchen Sink Press, the series began in 1986 with the story "Xenozoic!" which was included in the horror comics anthology Death Rattle #8. This was shortly followed by Xenozoic Tales #1 in February 1987. Kitchen Sink published 14 issues between 1987 and 1996 and it has since been reprinted by several publishers, including Marvel Comics, Dark Horse Comics, and Flesk Publications.

The series was well-received and in the early 1990s it won four Harvey Awards and three Eisner Awards. Despite this, issues started to be released further apart, eventually ceasing mid-story arc in issue #14.

Xenozoic Tales also proved moderately successful under the title Cadillacs and Dinosaurs and spawned an animated series on CBS, an arcade game from Capcom, a Sega CD video game from Rocket Science Games, action figures, candy bars, and a Twilight 2000 system role-playing game. The comic book reprints from Kitchen Sink and Marvel, and the continuation from Topps Comics, also used the Cadillacs and Dinosaurs name. The title Cadillacs and Dinosaurs and the likenesses of classic Cadillac automobiles were used with the consent of General Motors, which holds the phrase "Cadillacs and Dinosaurs" as a trademark and has licensed it for the comic books, the video game and the animated series.

Schultz's illustrated novella, Storms at Sea, published in 2015 with Flesk Publications, includes details which appear to provide a back-history of the circumstances that led to the creating of the world as shown in Xenozoic Tales.

Publication history

Xenozoic Tales (Kitchen Sink Press): 1987–1996 
The original publication of Xenozoic Tales ran irregularly from 1987 until 1996, often with multiple years taking place between issues. The final issue, #14, ends in the middle of a story arc. While there is no time-frame, in 2012 Flesk Publications revealed they had tentative plans with Mark Schultz to create an additional 80 pages of story to complete the current story arc. The most recent mention of this is in the last pages of the Flesk collection Xenozoic where it states: "The adventures of Hannah Dundee & Jack Tenrec will continue. Look for more mystery, mayhem, & intrigue in future Xenozoic stories!"

Cadillacs and Dinosaurs (Marvel Comics): 1990–1991 
In 1990, under the banner of Epic Comics, Marvel Comics began reprinting Xenozoic Tales in full color under the title Cadillacs and Dinosaurs. These editions had completely new covers; however, only the first six issues were reprinted and the series ceased publication in April 1991. As of yet, these colorized versions have never been released in a collected form.

Cadillacs and Dinosaurs (Topps Comics): 1994 

In 1994, Topps Comics began running their own continuation of Xenozoic Tales, also under the title Cadillacs and Dinosaurs. The series only ran for one year, in which they released nine issues. The stories were designed to complement the original series, taking place between in the midpoint of the story "Lords of the Earth" in Xenozoic Tales #10, right after Wilhelmina Scharnhorst is elected governor, but before Jack has been driven into exile. In the original story, that moment lasts for only a few minutes, but Topps Comics sought the permission of Mark Schultz to turn it into a "moment that stretches". While Mark Schultz did not write or draw any of the comics released by Topps, he was consulted on some of the story arcs to make sure they were kept as true to his vision as possible.

The series ran three main story arcs over the course of nine issues before "going on hiatus" right before the release of Xenozoic Tales issue #13. A fourth storyline titled "Hammer of the Gods" was in the works, being drawn by David Roach, but was never released.

Story
In the storyline, Earth has been ravaged by pollution and natural disasters of all sorts in the 1990s. To escape this, humanity built vast underground cities in which they lived for approximately 500 years. Upon emerging, the humans found that the world had been reclaimed by previously extinct lifeforms (most spectacularly, dinosaurs and prehistoric mammals). In the new 'Xenozoic' era, technology is extremely limited and those with mechanical skills command a great deal of respect and influence.

The two main characters of the series are mechanic Jack Tenrec and scientist/love interest, Hannah Dundee. Tenrec operates a garage in which he restores cars, particularly Cadillacs. Given that the post-apocalyptic world no longer possesses the ability to refine oil, Tenrec modifies his cars to run on dinosaur guano. These cars, of course, are frequently chased by rampaging dinosaurs in pulp style action-adventure stories.

Other characters include various criminals, politicians, scientists, and inventors who populate the dystopian world of tomorrow. There is also a race of reptilian humanoids called the Grith who cannot speak in a human language but instead communicate by spelling words with Scrabble tiles. These creatures have befriended Tenrec, and apparently have the ability to communicate telepathically with the dinosaurs. Added into the mix is Hermes, a half-tamed Allosaurus Jack raised, and who basically acts as the most threatening guard dog one could ask for.

Characters
Jack Tenrec – An old blood mechanic who runs a garage. (Old bloods are a group of people who repair machines that were left over from the great cataclysm that forced humanity to live underground.) Despite his gruff behavior, he is considered leader by the people in the City in the Sea (formerly Manhattan) more than their governors; he starts an on/off relationship with the beautiful Wasoon ambassador and scientist Hannah Dundee.
Hannah Dundee – A beautiful scientist and ambassador from Wasoon (formerly Washington, D.C.). She came to the City in the Sea in order to build relations with her people, as not many trust them. Over the course of the comics, she becomes the love interest of Jack Tenrec despite their different views on things.
Hermes – An Allosaurus who Jack raised after his mother was killed by poachers; although he can be vicious to others, he is gentle with Jack and Hannah. He first appeared when he saved his beloved master after he was being threatened by one of the Terhunes.
Remfro Rhynchus – A reclusive yet obsessed expert on zekes and their flying patterns, he soon builds an engineless plane that relies on thermal updrafts to keep afloat.
Mustapha Cairo – An engineer and a mechanic who is a good friend to Jack. He becomes one of their allies in their fight for survival in the post-apocalyptic world overrun by dinosaurs and saber-toothed tigers.
Kirgo – An elderly mechanic who is a friend to Jack. He seems to know why some people hate Jack and want him dead.
Ryder Corbett – An expert tracker who is a rival to Jack Tenrec. He is intelligent and crafty. Able to make a rifle powerful enough to kill a Shivat; also has a robotic prosthetic arm with 2 claws that looks like a Shivat hand.
The Terhunes – A family of poachers who are the enemies of Jack Tenrec; they have tried many times to kill him, but always fail.
Mother Terhune - Leader of The Terhune Clan, she is small, old, and frail compared to her 3 sons, but is intelligent, short-tempered, and violent, and also seems to hate Tenrec and Dundee. She is also known to smoke many cigars.
Hammer Terhune – An overweight poacher who despises Jack Tenrec, indicating that they have met before, but on very bad terms. He tries to kill Jack and Hannah many times, but always fails. He has two brothers named Wrench and Vice. He was later shot by Hannah after he took Jack hostage while escaping from an enraged woolly mammoth.
Wrench Terhune – Hammer's younger brother who is the middle child of the Terhune family. Previously, Wrench and some other poachers had murdered a Wasoon patrol. In the first issue, they plotted to kill the visiting Wasoon ambassador, in the belief that the Wasoons were coming after the murderers. When Jack intervened, Wrench tried to kill him; however, Hermes came to Jack's rescue and bit Wrench to death before flinging his corpse through a window.
Vice Terhune – The youngest brother of the Terhune family. Like his two older brothers, he is a poacher and has a huge dislike of Jack Tenrec. He appears in two issues, the first when he finds an old case which he believes has gold in it, but later discovers that it has old American dollars instead. Later he turns to thieving, after the City in the Sea imposes a hunting license on all hunters.
Wilhelmina Scharnhorst – The leader of the "Moles", a group of people who search the ancient ruins in and under the City in the Sea. She despises the old blood mechanics, as she believes that they are nothing but nuisances who stand in the way of progress.
The Grith – A mysterious race of intelligent lizard men who cannot communicate in a human language, but can communicate with Scrabble tiles. They are said to be descendants from an unknown species of dinosaur. They are allies with Jack for some unknown reason and, later, they ally with Hannah as well.
Hobbs – Jack's contact in the Grith. He appears when Hannah was taken by the Grith, then informs them that a settlement is about to be destroyed by an earthquake.
Wild Child – A human teenager who was raised by the Grith who wears a loincloth and animal hide boots. He wandered away from his home when he was only three years old and was then attacked by a pack of cave hyenas, but was saved by the Grith, who then raised him as one of their own. Ten years later, Hannah discovered Wild Child and tried to take him back, but eventually knew that he belonged with the Grith. Hannah reluctantly told the boy's mother that she had found nothing.

Prehistoric animals
In the Xenozoic Tales universe, the humans have developed their own names for prehistoric creatures. Below are the names used in the comics and the real-life creatures they refer to.
Slither – A generic term for any dinosaur or prehistoric reptile.
Cutter – Allosaurus. A mid-sized carnivore, relatively common. Hermes, Jack's half-tame dinosaur, is a juvenile.
Cave bear – Same name. Large and mostly peaceful bear, though dangerous if threatened.
Harvestman / Cogspider – Giant opilione. Lives deep underground in huge colonies. If exposed to pressure at sea level, it will slowly die.
Hornbill – Parasaurolophus. A peaceful and gentle species of hadrosaurs, travels in herds.
Horses – One of the few modern animals still existing in the Xenozoic Era, they are used as mounts by many of the surviving humans.
Crawler – Ankylosaurus. Peaceful but dangerous plant eating Ankylosaurs with body armor and a club tail.
Bonehead – Pachycephalosaurus. A species of Pachycephalosaur with a bony skull on its head.
Mack – A general term for ceratopsians, generally used for Triceratops or Styracosaurus. Easily startled herd animal.
Mammoth / Big Woolly / Tusker – Woolly Mammoth. Ill-tempered elephants. Hannah tried to catch one, and in a rage it followed them back to Jack's garage, before being killed in a run-in with a Mack herd.
Sabre-Tooth Cat – Smilodon. Cats with knife-like canines, hunts animals such as Macks and Mammoths.
Sambuck – Apatosaurus. Large sauropod, lives in herds and startles easily.
Tri-colored Sambuck – Diplodocus. Large sauropod, lives in herds and startles easily much like Sambucks.
Tree Grazer – Brachiosaurus. The largest herbivore in the world, lives in small herds.
Sailback – A general term used for sailed synapsids such as Dimetrodon and Edaphosaurus.
Shark – Cretoxyrhina. A species of shark that is mostly found in the waters surrounding the City in the Sea.
Shivat – Tyrannosaurus rex. The largest carnivore in the world, sticks to the higher regions. Mates for life. A mutated specimen possessed chameleonlike abilities and an ultra-tough hide. Its genitals are highly prized on the black market.
Shrike – Deinonychus. Small pack Dromaeosaurs.
Thresher – Mosasaur. Large sea hunter, possesses sonar.
Triton – Trilobite. An early arthropod, in real life they were usually 3–6 cm long, but in the comic they can grow as long as 2 metres.
Wahochuck – Stegosaurus. A fairly common animal.
Zeke – Pteranodon. Scavenger sensitive to underwater predators. A flock was drawn to the city to warn of attacks on fishing boats by Threshers.

Locations
The setting of Xenozoic Tales is along the Eastern coast of North America during the mid-27th century, most of America's cities having been destroyed during the Great Cataclysm, with a few surviving.
The City in the Sea – The remains of Manhattan and the series' main setting. As its name implies, it consists of several buildings that survived when Manhattan was flooded during the Great Cataclysm. The Empire State Building was one of the surviving buildings.
Jack's Garage – A large garage that is both the home and workshop of Jack Tenrec.
Wassoon – The home of Hannah Dundee, located in the south and the remains of Washington, D.C. Its people the Wassoon are a tribe of scholars, but they are treated with disdain by many other surviving humans for reasons unknown. They sent Hannah to the City in the Sea with the hopes of gaining access to their library.
Calhoon Mines – A copper mine located a few days from the City in the Sea. It is where the copper for the City in the Sea is mined; it was once besieged by a man-eating Shivat until it was killed by Jack and Hannah.
Fessenden's Station - A scientific research station that is a several-days journey from the City in the Sea, deep within the treacherous jungles, and established by Dr. Phileas Fessenden, a scientist highly revered by the city. Jack and Hannah discover the grisly fate of Fessenden and all his staff there, and the place is torched and declared forbidden. The Grith later secretly inform Jack that the abandoned station is the "key to everything".

Animated television series 
In 1993 Nelvana adapted Xenozoic Tales into an animated television show for CBS Kids. The show lasted for one season of thirteen episodes. While not a direct adaptation of the comic book series, many of the episodes featured stories taken directly from Xenozoic Tales. The show has developed a cult following and is currently available to watch in the U.S. through Amazon Video.

Collected editions 
The original series has been collected multiple times, starting with Kitchen Sink Press in 1989, Dark Horse Comics in 2003, and eventually being collected in a single volume by Flesk Publications in 2013. Flesk also released a limited edition hardcover of the book after raising funds through Kickstarter. An Artists Edition was released by IDW Publishing in August 2013 and contains oversized reprints of the original art from issues #9–14 of the series. While these collections all contain the complete original series written by Mark Schultz, only the Kitchen Sink Press releases contain the backup stories drawn by Steve Stiles, though in 2012 Flesk Publications made it clear they were hunting for the original art from his stories for a future release.

The Epic Comics colorized issues and the Topps Comics series have never been released in collected form.

Awards 
Mark Schultz has won five Harvey Awards for his work on Xenozoic Tales. He won three times for Best Artist or Penciller (1990, 1992, 1993), once for Best Inker (1997), and once for Best Single Issue or Story (Xenozoic Tales #11, 1992).

Xenozoic Tales also received two Eisner Awards: one for Best Short Story (Xenozoic Tales #12 "Two Cities" 1992) and one for Best Black and White Series (1991).

References

External links
 
 Cadillacs and Dinosaurs a.k.a. Xenozoic Tales at Don Markstein's Toonopedia. Archived from the original on April 13, 2012.
 
 Prehistoric Pulp: review of Xenozoic Tales a.k.a. Cadillacs and Dinosaurs

Dinosaurs in comic books
1987 comics debuts
Topps Comics titles
Dark Horse Comics titles
Marvel Comics titles
Post-apocalyptic comics
Comics adapted into television series
Comics adapted into video games
Cadillac
Defunct American comics